The 1986–87 Toronto Maple Leafs season was the team's 70th season competing in the National Hockey League (NHL).

Off-season

NHL Draft

Regular season
Francis "King" Clancy, former defenceman with Ottawa and Toronto, had to undergo surgery to remove his gall bladder. Unfortunately, infection from the gall bladder seeped into his
body during surgery, causing him to go into septic shock. He died November 10, 1986.

Final standings

Schedule and results

Player statistics

Regular season
Scoring

Goaltending

Playoffs
Scoring

Goaltending

Playoffs

Series E                      W  L   GF   GA
  Toronto Maple Leafs         4  2   15   12
  St. Louis Blues             2  4   12   15
   
  Apr 8    Toronto Maple Leafs   1   3  at St. Louis Blues
  Apr 9    Toronto Maple Leafs   3   2  at St. Louis Blues  00:10:17 OT
  Apr 11       St. Louis Blues   5   3  at Toronto Maple Leafs
  Apr 12       St. Louis Blues   1   2  at Toronto Maple Leafs
  Apr 14   Toronto Maple Leafs   2   1  at St. Louis Blues
  Apr 16       St. Louis Blues   0   4  at Toronto Maple Leafs

Round 2
Series K                      W  L   GF   GA
  Detroit Red Wings           4  3   20   18
  Toronto Maple Leafs         3  4   18   20
   
  Apr 21   Toronto Maple Leafs   4   2  at Detroit Red Wings
  Apr 23   Toronto Maple Leafs   7   2  at Detroit Red Wings
  Apr 25     Detroit Red Wings   4   2  at Toronto Maple Leafs
  Apr 27     Detroit Red Wings   2   3  at Toronto Maple Leafs  00:09:31 OT
  Apr 29   Toronto Maple Leafs   0   3  at Detroit Red Wings
  May 1      Detroit Red Wings   4   2  at Toronto Maple Leafs
  May 3    Toronto Maple Leafs   0   3  at Detroit Red Wings

  Detroit Red Wings win series 4 games to 3

Transactions
The Maple Leafs have been involved in the following transactions during the 1986-87 season.

Trades

Free agents

Awards and records
 Rick Vaive, Molson Cup (Most game star selections for Toronto Maple Leafs)

See also
 1986–87 NHL season

References

 Maple Leafs on Hockey Database

Toronto Maple Leafs season, 1986-87
Toronto Maple Leafs seasons
Toronto